Whitehill Down is a Site of Special Scientific Interest in Carmarthen & Dinefwr, Wales.

See also
List of Sites of Special Scientific Interest in Carmarthen & Dinefwr

References 

Sites of Special Scientific Interest in Carmarthen & Dinefwr